Ung frue forsvunnet (Young Woman Missing) is a 1953 Norwegian drama film directed by Edith Carlmar. The film stars Astri Jacobsen, Adolf Bjerke, Lalla Carlsen, Wenche Foss, Espen Skjønberg, and Guri Stormoen.

Plot
The university instructor Berger (Adolf Bjerke) returns home from a mountain hike and discovers that his young wife, Eva (Astri Jacobsen), has disappeared. The maid has neither heard nor seen anything from the woman since the day the Berger left. What Berger does not know about his wife's past is that she was addicted to drugs and that her disappearance was due to a relapse. In desperation, she sought out her old friend, the decrepit pharmacist Møller (Espen Skjønberg) who previously led her into drug abuse. On the surface, the marriage seemed to be going well, but no one understood how much it tormented the young woman to feel mentally inferior to her husband.

Cast
 Astri Jacobsen as Eva Berger 
 Adolf Bjerke as Arne Berger, a university instructor
 Lalla Carlsen as Johanne Antonsen, the maid 
 Kåre Siem as Dr. Krogh 
 Vesla Christensen as Ingrid Lindstrøm 
 Wenche Foss as Tora Haug, a detective
 Espen Skjønberg as Einar Møller, a pharmacist 
 Nanna Stenersen as Birgit Lie, a pharmacist and friend 
 Egil Hjorth-Jenssen as Olsen 
 Guri Stormoen as Thea 
 Signe Bernau as a curious neighbor
 Lisbeth Bull as the detective on duty 
 Bjarne Hansen as a police driver
 Arne Hestenes as a police lawyer
 Kåre Løwing as an impatient man

References

External links
 
 Ung frue forsvunnet at the National Library of Norway

1953 films
Norwegian drama films
Norwegian black-and-white films
Films directed by Edith Carlmar
1953 drama films